Pattipola railway station is the 66th station on the Main Line, and is  away from Colombo. The station has one platform with a second track as a siding loop. All the trains that run on the Main Line, including the Podi Menike and Udarata Menike express trains stop at the station.

Continuity

References

Railway stations in Nuwara Eliya District
Railway stations on the Main Line (Sri Lanka)
Railway stations opened in 1893